Austrian singer Falco released nine studio albums, four live albums, 12 compilation albums, and 38 singles.

In 1981, he released his first single, "That Scene", which could not enter the charts. His second single and the first of his first studio album, "Der Kommissar", peaked at number one on the German and Austrian single charts. Falco's first studio album, Einzelhaft, debuted at number one of the Austrian album charts and 19 of the German album charts. His second studio album, Junge Roemer, peaked at number one of the Austrian album charts.

Albums

Studio albums

Live albums

Compilation albums

Tribute albums

Singles

As lead artist 

"N/A" means that the chart didn't exist at the time. The modern French chart was launched by Syndicat national de l'édition phonographique (SNEP) in November 1984.

As featured artist

Notes

References

External links 
 Falco at AllMusic
 
 

Discography
Discographies of Austrian artists
Pop music discographies